Youssouf Kamso Mara (born 24 December 1994) is a Guinean professional footballer who last played as a midfielder for the Czech club Slovan Liberec.

Professional career
Mara began his career in France before moving to the Czech Republic with Vlašim. He made his professional debut with Vlašim in a 2-1 Czech National Football League win over FK Baník Sokolov on 30 July 2017. On 18 July 2018, Mara transferred to Slovan Liberec.

International career
Born in Guinea, Mara is of Ivorian descent. Mara debuted for the Guinea national football team in a 1-0 friendly loss to Comoros on 12 October 2019.

References

External links
 
 NFT profile
 Slovan Liberec Profile

1994 births
Living people
Sportspeople from Conakry
Guinean footballers
Guinea international footballers
FC Slovan Liberec players
FC Sellier & Bellot Vlašim players
FC Vysočina Jihlava players
Beitar Jerusalem F.C. players
Czech First League players
Czech National Football League players
Championnat National 2 players
Israeli Premier League players
Guinean expatriate footballers
Expatriate footballers in France
Expatriate footballers in the Czech Republic
Expatriate footballers in Israel
Guinean expatriate sportspeople in France
Guinean expatriate sportspeople in the Czech Republic
Guinean expatriate sportspeople in Israel
Association football forwards
Guinean people of Ivorian descent
Hyères FC players